Merrill (officially Merrill Lynch, Pierce, Fenner & Smith Incorporated), previously branded Merrill Lynch, is an American investment management and wealth management division of Bank of America. Along with BofA Securities, the investment banking arm, both firms engage in prime brokerage and broker-dealer activities. The firm is headquartered in New York City, and once occupied the entire 34 stories of 250 Vesey Street, part of the Brookfield Place complex in Manhattan. Merrill employs over 14,000 financial analysts and manages $2.3 trillion in client assets. The company also operates Merrill Edge, a division for investment and related services, including call center counsultancy.

Prior to 2009, the company was publicly owned and traded on the New York Stock Exchange. Merrill Lynch & Co. agreed to be acquired by Bank of America on September 14, 2008, at the height of the financial crisis of 2007–2008, the same weekend that Lehman Brothers was allowed to fail. The acquisition was completed in January 2009 and Merrill Lynch & Co., Inc. was merged into Bank of America Corporation in October 2018, with certain Bank of America subsidiaries continuing to carry the Merrill Lynch name, including the broker-dealer Merrill Lynch, Pierce, Fenner & Smith. In 2019, Bank of America rebranded the unit to "Merrill".

Merrill Lynch rose to prominence on the strength of its network of financial advisors, sometimes referred to as the "thundering herd", that allowed it to place securities it underwrote directly. In contrast, many established Wall Street firms, such as Morgan Stanley, relied on groups of independent brokers for placement of the securities they underwrote. It was once known as the "Catholic" firm of Wall Street and most of its executives were Irish Catholics.

History

Founding and early history
The company was founded on January 6, 1914, when Charles E. Merrill opened Charles E. Merrill & Co. for business at 7 Wall Street in New York City. A few months later, Merrill's friend, Edmund C. Lynch, joined him, and in 1915 the name was officially changed to Merrill, Lynch & Co. At that time, the firm's name included a comma between Merrill and Lynch, which was dropped in 1938. In 1916, Winthrop H. Smith joined the firm.

In 1921, the company purchased Pathé Exchange, which later became RKO Pictures. In 1926, the firm acquired a controlling interest in Safeway Inc., transforming the small grocery store into the country's third-largest grocery store chain by the early 1930s.

In 1930, Charles E. Merrill led the firm through a major restructuring, spinning-off the company's retail brokerage business to E. A. Pierce & Co. to focus on investment banking. Along with the business, Merrill also transferred the bulk of its employees, including Edmund C. Lynch and Winthrop H. Smith. Charles Merrill received a minority interest in E.A. Pierce in the transaction. Throughout the 1930s, E.A. Pierce remained the largest brokerage in the U.S. The firm, led by Edward A. Pierce, Edmund Lynch and Winthrop Smith proved to be one of the most innovative in the industry, introducing IBM machines into the business's record keeping. Additionally, by 1938, E.A. Pierce controlled the largest wire network with a private network of over 23,000 miles of telegraph wires. These wires were typically used for orders.

Despite its strong position in the market, E.A. Pierce was struggling financially in the 1930s and was thinly capitalized. Following the death of Edmund C. Lynch in 1938, Winthrop Smith began discussions with Charles E. Merrill, who owned a minority interest in E.A. Pierce about a possible merger of the two firms. On April 1, 1940, Merrill Lynch, merged with Edward A. Pierce's E. A. Pierce & Co. and Cassatt & Co., a Philadelphia-based brokerage firm in which both Merrill Lynch and E.A. Pierce held an interest. and was briefly known as Merrill Lynch, E. A. Pierce, and Cassatt. The company became the first on Wall Street to publish an annual fiscal report in 1941.

In 1941, Merrill Lynch, E. A. Pierce, and Cassatt merged with Fenner & Beane, a New Orleans-based investment bank and commodities company. Throughout the 1930s, Fenner & Beane was consistently the second largest securities firm in the U.S. The combined firm, which became the clear leader in securities brokerage in the U.S., was renamed Merrill Lynch, Pierce, Fenner & Beane.

Post-war years
In 1952, the company formed Merrill Lynch & Co. as a holding company and officially incorporated after nearly half a century as a partnership. On December 31, 1957, The New York Times referred to that name as "a sonorous bit of Americana" and said, "After sixteen years of popularizing [it], Merrill Lynch, Pierce, Fenner, and Beane is going to change it—and thereby honor the man who has been largely responsible for making the name of a brokerage house part of an American saga," Winthrop H. Smith, who had been running the company since 1940. The merger made the company the largest securities firm in the world, with offices in more than 98 cities and membership on 28 exchanges. At the start of the firm's fiscal year on March 1, 1958, the firm's name became "Merrill Lynch, Pierce, Fenner & Smith" and the company became a member of the New York Stock Exchange.

In 1964, Merrill Lynch acquired C. J. Devine & Co., the leading dealer in U.S. Government Securities. The merger came together due to the death of Christopher J. Devine in May 1963. The C. J. Devine & Co. partners, referred to as "The Devine Boys", formed Merrill Lynch Government Securities Inc., giving the firm a strong presence in the government securities market. The Government Securities business brought Merrill Lynch the needed leverage to establish many of the unique money market products and government bond mutual fund products, responsible for much of the firm's growth in the 1970s and 1980s.

In June 1971, the company became a public company via an initial public offering, a year after the New York Stock Exchange allowed member firms to become publicly-owned. It was a multinational corporation with over US$1.8 trillion in client assets operating in more than 40 countries around the world.

In 1977, the company introduced its Cash management account (CMA), which enabled customers to transfer all their cash into a money market fund, and included check-writing capabilities and a credit card.

In 1978, it significantly buttressed its securities underwriting business by acquiring White Weld & Co., a small but prestigious old-line investment bank.

In the late 1990s, Maxim Shashenkov, who was in charge of Alfa-Bank's Alfa Securities Ltd, London, of the Alfa Group of companies, was formerly Vice President for Russia of the London branch of Merrill Lynch.

Canadian operations in the 1990s
In 1990, the company sold its Canadian private client operations to CIBC Wood Gundy.

In June 1998, Merrill Lynch re-entered the Canadian investment business with its purchase of Midland Walwyn Inc. At the time, Canada was the seventh-largest market for personal investment.

In December 2001, Merrill Lynch sold Midland Walwyn to CIBC Wood Gundy.

Investment in TMS Entertainment (2003)
In 2003, Merrill Lynch became the second-largest shareholder of Japanese animation studio TMS Entertainment. In a report to the Finance Ministry, the Merrill Lynch group said it had acquired a 7.54% stake in TMS by purchasing 3.33 million shares. Merrill Lynch purchased the stake purely for investment purposes and had no intention of acquiring control of the firm's management.

Subprime mortgage crisis

In November 2007, Merrill Lynch announced it would write-down $8.4 billion in losses associated with the subprime mortgage crisis, and terminated E. Stanley O'Neal as its chief executive. O'Neal had earlier approached Wachovia for a merger, without prior Board approval, but the talks ended after O'Neal's dismissal. Merrill Lynch named John Thain as its new CEO that month. In his first days at work in December 2007, Thain made changes in Merrill Lynch's top management, announcing that he would bring in former New York Stock Exchange (NYSE) colleagues such as Nelson Chai as CFO and Margaret D. Tutwiler as head of communications. Later that month, the firm announced it would sell its commercial finance business to General Electric, and would sell shares of its stock to Temasek Holdings, a Singapore government investment group, in an effort to raise capital. The deal raised more than $6 billion.

In July 2008, Thain announced $4.9 billion fourth-quarter losses for the company from defaults and bad investments in the ongoing mortgage crisis. In one year between July 2007 and July 2008, Merrill Lynch lost $19.2 billion, or $52 million daily. The company's stock price had also declined significantly during that time. Two weeks later, the company announced the sale of select hedge funds and securities in an effort to reduce their exposure to mortgage-related investments. Temasek Holdings agreed to purchase the funds and increase its investment in the company by $3.4 billion.

Then-New York Attorney General Andrew Cuomo threatened to sue Merrill Lynch in August 2008 over its misrepresentation of the risk on mortgage-backed securities. A week earlier, Merrill Lynch had offered to buy back $12 billion in auction-rate debt and said it was surprised by the lawsuit. Three days later, the company froze hiring and revealed that it had charged almost $30 billion in losses to its subsidiary in the United Kingdom, exempting them from taxes in that country. On August 22, 2008, CEO John Thain announced an agreement with the Massachusetts Secretary of the Commonwealth to buy back all auction-rate securities from customers with less than $100 million in deposit with the firm, beginning in October 2008 and expanding in January 2009. On September 5, 2008 Goldman Sachs downgraded Merrill Lynch's stock to "conviction sell" and warned of further losses at the company. Bloomberg reported in September 2008 that Merrill Lynch had lost $51.8 billion on mortgage-backed securities as part of the subprime mortgage crisis.

CDO losses
Merrill Lynch, like many other banks, became heavily involved in the mortgage-based collateralized debt obligation (CDO) market in the early 2000s. According to an article in Credit magazine, Merrill's rise to be the leader of the CDO market began in 2003 when Christopher Ricciardi brought his CDO team from Credit Suisse First Boston to Merrill.

To provide a ready supply of mortgages for the CDOs, Merrill purchased First Franklin Financial Corp., one of the largest subprime lenders in the country, in December 2006. Between 2006 and 2007, Merrill was "lead underwriter" on 136 CDOs worth $93 billion. By the end of 2007, the value of these CDOs was collapsing, but Merrill had held onto portions of them, creating billions of dollars in losses for the company. In mid-2008, Merrill sold a group of CDOs that had once been valued at $30.6 billion to Lone Star Funds for $1.7 billion in cash and a $5.1 billion loan.

In April 2009, bond insurance company MBIA sued Merrill Lynch for fraud and five other violations. These were related to the credit default swap "insurance" contracts Merrill had bought from MBIA on four of Merrill's mortgage-based collateralized debt obligations. These were the "ML-Series" CDOs, Broderick CDO 2, Highridge ABS CDO I, Broderick CDO 3, and Newbury Street CDO. MBIA claimed, among other things, that Merrill defrauded MBIA about the quality of these CDOs, and that it was using the complicated nature of these particular CDOs (CDOs squared and cubed) to hide the problems it knew about in the securities that the CDOs were based on. However, in 2010 Justice Bernard Fried disallowed all but one of the charges: the claim by MBIA that Merrill had committed breach of contract by promising the CDOs were worthy of an AAA rating when, it alleges, in reality, they weren't. When the CDOs lost value, MBIA wound up owing Merrill a large amount of money. Merrill disputed MBIA's claims.

In 2009, Rabobank sued Merrill over a CDO named Norma. Rabobank later claimed that its case against Merrill was very similar to the SEC's fraud charges against Goldman Sachs and its Abacaus CDOs. Rabobank alleged that a hedge fund named Magnetar Capital had chosen assets to go into Norma, and allegedly bet against them, but that Merrill had not informed Rabobank of this fact. Instead, Rabobank alleges that Merrill told it that NIR Group was selecting the assets. When the CDO value tanked, Rabobank was left owing Merrill a large amount of money. Merrill disputed the arguments of Rabobank, with a spokesman claiming "The two matters are unrelated and the claims today are not only unfounded but weren't included in the Rabobank lawsuit filed nearly a year ago".

Sale to Bank of America

Significant losses were attributed to the drop in value of its large and unhedged mortgage portfolio in the form of collateralized debt obligations. Trading partners' loss of confidence in Merrill Lynch's solvency and ability to refinance money market obligations ultimately led to its sale. During the week of September 8, 2008, Lehman Brothers came under severe liquidity pressures, with its survival in question. If Lehman Brothers failed, investors were afraid that the contagion could spread to the other surviving investment banks. On Sunday, September 14, 2008, Bank of America announced it was in talks to purchase Merrill Lynch for $38.25 billion in stock. Later that day, Merrill Lynch was sold to Bank of America for 0.8595 shares of Bank of America common stock for each Merrill Lynch common share, or about US$50 billion or $29 per share. This price represented a 70.1% premium over the September 12 closing price or a 38% premium over Merrill's book value of $21 a share, but a discount of 61% from its September 2007 price.

Congressional testimony by Bank of America CEO Kenneth Lewis, as well as internal emails released by the House Oversight Committee, indicated that the merger was transacted under pressure from federal officials, who said that they would otherwise seek the replacement of Bank of America's management as a condition of any government assistance. In March 2009, it was reported that in 2008, Merrill Lynch received billions of dollars from its insurance arrangements with AIG, including $6.8 billion from funds provided by the United States government to bail out AIG.

Post-merger with Bank of America
After merging Merrill Lynch into its businesses, Bank of America continued to operate Merrill Lynch for its wealth management services and integrated Merrill Lynch's investment bank into the newly formed BofA Securities.

Launch of Merrill Edge
On June 21, 2010, the company launched Merrill Edge, an electronic trading platform.

Rebranding
In February 2019, Bank of America announced the division was to be rebranded from "Merrill Lynch" to "Merrill".

Regulatory actions

Orange County settlement
In 1998, Merrill Lynch paid Orange County, California $400 million to settle accusations that it sold inappropriate and risky investments to former county treasurer Robert Citron. Citron lost $1.69 billion, which forced the county to file for bankruptcy in December 1994. The county sued a dozen or more securities companies, advisors and accountants, but Merrill settled without admitting liability, paying $400 million of a total $600 million recovered by the county.

Analyst Research settlement
In 2002, Merrill Lynch agreed to pay out $100 million for publishing misleading research. As part of the agreement with the New York attorney general and other state securities regulators, Merrill Lynch agreed to increase research disclosure and work to decouple research from investment banking.

Misleading of investors by Henry Blodget
Between 1999 and 2001, during the dot-com bubble, Henry Blodget, a well-known analyst at Merrill Lynch, gave assessments about stocks in private emails that conflicted with what he publicly published via Merrill. In 2003, he was charged with civil securities fraud by the U.S. Securities and Exchange Commission. He settled without admitting or denying the allegations and was subsequently barred from the securities industry for life. He paid a $2 million fine and $2 million disgorgement.

Enron/Merrill Lynch Nigerian barge
In 2004, convictions of Merrill executives marked the only instance in the Enron investigation where the government criminally charged any officials from the banks and securities firms that allegedly helped Enron execute its accounting scandals. The case revolved around a 1999 transaction involving Merrill, Enron and the sale of some electricity-producing barges off the coast of Nigeria. The charges alleged that the 1999 sale of an interest in Nigerian power barge by an Enron entity to Merrill Lynch was a sham that allowed Enron to illegally book about $12 million in pretax profit, when in fact there was no real sale and no real profit. Four former Merrill top executives and two former midlevel Enron officials faced conspiracy and fraud charges. The Merrill Lynch executives were convicted, but, unusually, all three of those that appealed subsequently had their charges overturned by the 5th U.S. Circuit Court of Appeals in New Orleans who called the conspiracy and wire fraud charges "flawed." The Justice Department decided not to retry the case after the reversal of the verdict. Merrill reached its own settlement, firing bankers and agreeing to the outside oversight of its structured-finance transactions. It also settled civil fraud charges brought by the U.S. Securities and Exchange Commission, without admitting or denying fault.

Discrimination charges
On June 26, 2007, the U.S. Equal Employment Opportunity Commission (EEOC) brought suit against Merrill Lynch, alleging the firm discriminated against Dr. Majid Borumand because of his Iranian nationality and Islamic religion, with "reckless disregard" for his protected civil rights. The EEOC lawsuit maintained that violations by the company were intentional and committed with malice. In another case concerning mistreatment of another Iranian employee by Merrill Lynch, on July 20, 2007, a National Association of Securities Dealers arbitration panel ordered the company to pay Fariborz Zojaji, a former Iranian employee, $1.6 million for being fired due to his Persian ethnicity. Merrill Lynch was criticized by both the National Iranian American Council, and the American-Arab Anti-Discrimination Committee.

On August 13, 2008, a New Jersey appeals court rendered a ruling against Merrill Lynch in a lawsuit filed by Darren Kwiatkowski, a gay employee who was called a “stupid fag” by another employee.

In August 2013, the company agreed to pay $160 million to settle a class action racism lawsuit brought by a longtime U.S. employee in 2005.  At the time the lawsuit was filed, 2% of the brokers at the company were black, despite a 30-year-old consent decree it had signed with the EEOC that required the company to increase its proportion of black brokers to 6.5%, and despite the fact that in 25 states, the company did not have a single black broker. The funds were available to all black brokers and trainees at the firm since May 2001, estimated to be 700–1,200 people. During the case, Merrill's black CEO, Stanley O'Neal, said that black brokers may have a harder time getting business for the company since most of its clients were white.

Market timing settlement
In March 2005, Merrill Lynch paid a $10 million civil penalty to settle allegations of improper activities at the firm's Fort Lee, New Jersey office. Three financial advisors, and a fourth who was involved to a lesser degree, placed 12,457 trades for Millennium Partners, a client, in at least 521 mutual funds and 63 mutual fund sub-accounts of at least 40 variable annuities. Millennium made profits in over half of the funds and fund sub-accounts. In those funds where Millennium made profits, its gains totalled about $60 million. Merrill Lynch failed to reasonably supervise these financial advisers, whose market timing siphoned short-term profits out of mutual funds and harmed long-term investors.

2008 bonus payments
In 2008, Merrill Lynch arranged for payment $3.6 billion in bonuses, one-third of the money received from the Troubled Asset Relief Program, for performance that year in what appeared to be "special timing," despite reported losses of $27 billion the same year.

Mismarking
In 2010, a Merrill Lynch trader in London who mismarked positions he had on behalf of the bank by $100 million to cover up his losses was banned by the United Kingdom's Financial Services Authority (FSA) from working in the securities industry in the UK for at least five years.

Misleading customers about trading venues
On 19 June 2018, the U.S. Securities and Exchange Commission (SEC) charged Merrill Lynch of misleading brokerage customers about trading venues between 2008 and 2013. Merrill Lynch admitted wrongdoing and agreed to pay a $42 million penalty.

Improper handling of ADRs
On 22 March 2019, Merrill Lynch agreed to pay more than $8 million to settle charges of improper handling of pre-released American depositary receipts under investigation of the U.S. Securities and Exchange Commission. Merrill Lynch neither admitted nor denied the investigation findings but agreed to pay disgorgement of more than $4.4 million in ill-gotten gains plus $724,000 in prejudgment interest and an additional penalty of $2.89 million.

See also

 Broker-dealer
 Calibuso, et al. v. Bank of America Corp., et al.
 Credit crunch
 Liquidity crisis
 Merrill Lynch, Pierce, Fenner & Smith, Inc. v. Dabit, a 2006 Supreme Court case involving securities fraud claims.
 Merrill Lynch, Pierce, Fenner & Smith Inc. v. Manning, a 2016 Supreme Court case involving naked short selling claims.
 List of UK judgments relating to excluded subject matter
 Primary dealer

References

Further reading

Merrill Lynch
 

 
1914 establishments in New York City
Bank of America legacy banks
Banks based in New York City
Brokerage firms
Companies formerly listed on the New York Stock Exchange
Financial services companies established in 1914
Banks established in 1914
2009 mergers and acquisitions
Investment banks in the United States
Investment management companies of the United States
Online brokerages
Primary dealers
Subprime mortgage crisis
Merrill family